ŽRK Budućnost is a women's handball team from Podgorica, Montenegro (previously, the club also appeared under the names ZRK Buducnost MONET, Buducnost Brillant and Buducnost Titograd). Among the numerous titles, Budućnost is two-times winner of EHF Women's Champions League

The club was founded on February 13, 1949, and played its first official game in 1950. The first trophy, the Cup of Yugoslavia, was won in 1984. In 1985, ŽRK Budućnost won the Yugoslavian championship, and went on to win their first European title (Cup Winners' Cup) that same year. At the time, the club was pronounced as "the best in the country". As of 1988/1989 season, ŽRK Budućnost dominated the national competition, and was the champion of all the now defunct countries – SFR Yugoslavia, FR Yugoslavia, Serbia & Montenegro. The club continued to dominate the national championship in Montenegro since it gained independence in 2006.
ŽRK Budućnost won the titles of European Champion twice - on seasons 2012 and 2015.

ŽRK Budućnost is strongly supported by Budućnost sports fans, the Varvari.

ŽRK Budućnost is a part of Budućnost Podgorica sports society.

Kits

Records of achievements
International titles (6)
Champions League:
Winners (2): 2012, 2015
Cup Winners' Cup:
Winners (3): 1985, 2006, 2010
EHF Cup
Winners (1): 1987
Women's Regional Handball League:
Winners (8): 2010, 2011, 2012, 2013, 2014, 2015, 2016, 2019

National Championships (33)
Yugoslav Championship:
Winners (4): 1985, 1989, 1990, 1992
FR Yugoslavia, Serbia & Montenegro Championship:
Winners (14): 1993, 1994, 1995, 1996, 1997, 1998, 1999, 2000, 2001, 2002, 2003, 2004, 2005, 2006
Montenegrin Championship:
Winners (15): 2007, 2008, 2009, 2010, 2011, 2012, 2013, 2014, 2015, 2016, 2017, 2018, 2019, 2021, 2022

National Cups (27)
Yugoslav Cup:
Winners (2): 1984, 1989
FR Yugoslavia, Serbia & Montenegro Cup:
Winners (9): 1995, 1996, 1997, 1998, 2000, 2001, 2002, 2005, 2006
Montenegrin Cup:
Winners (16): 2007, 2008, 2009, 2010, 2011, 2012, 2013, 2014, 2015, 2016, 2017, 2018, 2019, 2020, 2021, 2022

Others
4 times named The Best Club of Yugoslavia (1985, 1987, 1993, 1998)

Champions League

1985/86       1/2 FINAL
1989/90       1/4 FINAL
1990/91       1/4 FINAL
1995/96       1/8 FINAL
1996/97       1/8 FINAL
1997/98       1/2 FINAL
1998/99       1/2 FINAL
1999/00       1/2 FINAL
2000/01       1/2 FINAL
2001/02       1/2 FINAL
2002/03       1/4 FINAL
2003/04       1/4 FINAL
2004/05       Group Matches
2005/06       Group Matches 3rd – CWC Winner
2006/07       Group Matches
2007/08       Group Matches 3rd – CWC 1/8 FINAL
2008/09       Main Round
2009/10       Group Matches 3rd – CWC Winner
2010/11       1/2 FINAL
2011/12       Winner
2012/13       Main Round
2013/14       Runner-up
2014/15       Winner
2015/16       Final Four - 4th
2016/17       Final Four - 4th
2017/18       Quarter-final
2018/19       Quarter-final
2020/21       Quarter-final
2021/22       Group Matches

Team

Current squad
Squad for the 2022–23 season

Goalkeepers
 1  Andrea Škerović
 12  Armelle Attingré
 16  Marija Marsenić
 87  Jovana Kadović
Left Wingers
 88  Nađa Kadović
 91  Ivona Pavićević
Right Wingers
 21  Adriana Cardoso de Castro
 37  Nina Bulatović
Line players
 11  Ivana Godeč
 13  Andrijana Popović
 20  Tijana Lutovac
 97  Nikolina Vukčević

Left Backs
 44  Mari Plamenova Tomova
 95  Ilda Kepić
Central Backs
5  Nataša Ćorović
 10  Matea Pletikosić
 15  Gordana Marsenić
 33  Vanesa Agović
 90  Milena Raičević
Right Backs
9  Jelena Vukčević
 14  Katarina Džaferović

Transfers
Transfers for the 2023–24 season

 Joining
  Ann-Cathrin Giegerich (GK) (from  Debreceni VSC)
  Neslihan Çalışkan (LB) (from  Kastamonu Bld. GSK)
  Kalidiatou Niakaté (LB) (from  CSM București)
  Noémi Háfra (LB) (on loan from  Győri Audi ETO KC)
  Beyza Karaçam (RB) (from  Kristianstad Handboll)

 Leaving
  Ilda Kepić (LB) (to  CS Măgura Cisnădie)
  Matea Pletikosić (CB) (to  CSM Corona Brașov)

Staff members
Staff for the 2022–23 season
  Head Coach: Bojana Popović 
  Assistant Coach: Maja Savić 
  Goalkeeping Coach: Novak Ristović
  Fitness Coach: Danica Delić
  Fiziotherapeut: Andrija Damjanović
  Fiziotherapeut: Mitar Vujović
  Statistician: Vladimir Kovačević

Statistics

Top scorers in the EHF Champions League 
(All-Time) – Last updated after the 2021/22 season

There is no data available from 4 seasons (1998-2002).

Notable former players

 Marijana "Maja" Bulatović
 Zorica Pavićević
 Katica Lješković
 Olga Sekulić
 Svetlana Antić
 Ljiljana Vučević
/ Stanka Božović
 Mirsada Ganić
 Vesna Durković
 Dragana Pešić
 Marta Bojanović 
 Mirjana Milović
 Milanka Šćepanović
 Tatjana Jeraminok
 Anica Đurović
 Maja Savić
 Dragica Orlandić
 Mira Čelebić
 Aida Dorović
 Bojana Popović
 Sanja Jovović
 Marina Rakočević
 Snežana Damjanac
 Radmila Petrović
 Anđela Bulatović
 Sonja Barjaktarović 
 Marija Jovanović
 Ana Radović
 Biljana Novović 
 Suzana Lazović
 Mirjana Milenković
 Katarina Bulatović
 Ana Đokić
 Gabriella Markoč
 Marta Batinović
 Jelena Despotović
 Dijana Ujkić
 Đurđina Malović
 Ljubica Nenezić
 Đurđina Jauković
 Ema Alivodić
 Majda Mehmedović
 Jovanka Radičević
 Marina Rajčić
 Itana Grbić
 Tatjana Brnović
 Matea Pletikosić
 Sandra Kolaković
 Dragica Đurić
 Biljana Balać
 Tanja Tomanović
 Jelena Jovanović
 Zlata Paplacko
 Ljiljana Knežević
 Ana Vojčić
 Dragana Cvijić
 Željka Nikolić
 Sanja Vujović
 Andrea Lekić
 Iva Perica
 Dalija Erceg
 Sanela Knezović
 Dijana Jovetić
 Katarina Ježić
 Neli Irman
 Barbara Lazović
 Dragana Ristova
 Natalya Cygankova
 Natalya Anisimova
 Inna Mokhova
 Nigina Saidova
 Elena Dmitrieva
 Valeriia Maslova
 Larysa Karlova
 Lyudmyla Shevchenko
 Nina Getsko
 Tetyana Vorozhtsova
 Svitlana Morozova
 Hanna Burmystrova
 Izabela Puchacz
 Monika Marzec
 Kinga Achruk
 Gabriela Đukanović
 Cristina Neagu
 Cristina Laslo
 Tatyana Dzhandzhgava
 Tanja Logwin
 Irina Sirina
 Piroska Szamoránsky
 Clara Woltering
 Claudine Mendy
 Allison Pineau
 Camilla Dalby
 Darly Zoqbi
 Emily Stang Sando
 Bárbara Arenhart

Head coach history
 Pero Milošević
 Vinko Kandija
 Aleksandr Panov
 Nikola Petrović
 Duško Milić
 Milorad Milatović
 Tone Tiselj (2007–2008)
 Gyula Zsiga (2008–2010)
 Dragan Adžić (2010–2020)
 Bojana Popović (2020–present)

References

External links

Budućnost Podgorica
Deutsche Telekom
Montenegrin handball clubs
Handball clubs established in 1949
1949 establishments in Yugoslavia